Rudolph Felix Bauer (1667–1717) was a Baltic German in Russian Empire military service, also a statesman.

He started his military career at the army of Duchy of Mecklenburg-Strelitz. Later he belonged to Prussian Army. He participated on Great Northern War.

1710–1711 he was General-Governor of Governorate of Estonia.

References

1667 births
1717 deaths
Russian military personnel of the Great Northern War
Baltic-German people